Roger Federer won three Majors in 2004. The first came at the Australian Open over Marat Safin, 7–6(3), 6–4, 6–2. He went on to win his second Wimbledon crown over Andy Roddick, 4–6, 7–5, 7–6(3), 6–4.  In addition, Federer defeated the 2001 US Open Champion Lleyton Hewitt at the US Open for his first US Open title, 6–0, 7–6(3), 6–0.  Furthermore, Federer won three ATP Masters 1000 events, one on clay at Hamburg, and two on hard court in Indian Wells and Canada. Federer took the ATP 500 series event at Dubai, and wrapped up the year for the second time over Lleyton Hewitt at the Tennis Masters Cup. Federer was the first player to win three Grand Slams in a single season since Mats Wilander in 1988.

Federer became the first man in the Open Era to win at least three Grand Slams and the Year-End Championships. , Federer and Novak Djokovic are the only male tennis players to accomplish this, with Federer repeating the feat in 2006 and 2007 and Djokovic doing so in 2015.

Year summary
In 2004, Federer had one of the most dominating and successful years in the open era of modern men's tennis. He won three of the four Grand Slam singles tournaments, did not lose a match to anyone ranked in the top 10, won every final he reached, and was named the ITF Tennis World Champion. His win–loss record for the year was 74–6 with 11 titles, which included three of the year's four Grand Slams and three ATP Masters Series titles.

Early hard court season
Federer entered the 2004 Australian Open as the second seed behind American Andy Roddick. In the fourth round he rallied to defeat former number one and native son Lleyton Hewitt after dropping the first set. His nemesis David Nalbandian, who had won five of their six previous meetings, awaited him in the quarterfinals. Federer managed to dispatch the Argentine in four tight sets. The semifinals proved easier as Federer crunched world no. 3 Juan Carlos Ferrero and reached his first Australian Open final. His opponent in the final was former world no. 1 and 2000 US Open champion Marat Safin. After winning the opening set in a tiebreaker Federer secured a 7–6, 6–4, 6–2 championship win. This victory delivered him his first Australian Open and his second career Grand Slam. This win also saw him supplant Roddick as the world no. 1 on 2 February 2004, a ranking he would hold for an all-time record 237 consecutive weeks until 18 August 2008.

Federer's momentum was temporarily halted when he was defeated at the Rotterdam Open by Tim Henman.

Federer quickly rebounded in March, when he won the Dubai Tennis Championships, defeating Marat Safin in the first round and Spanish player Feliciano López in the final.

The next stop on the calendar was the masters tournament in Indian Wells, California. Federer entered Indian Wells looking to claim his first masters title since 2002 Hamburg Masters. Federer had not dropped a set going into the semifinals where he played American legend Andre Agassi. Agassi won the first set, but Federer rallied to win a spot in the finals for the first time in Indian Wells. He seized the opportunity at the 2004 Pacific Life Open, defeating Tim Henman in straight sets to win the title.

2004 also marked the year where he first met teenager and future arch-rival Rafael Nadal, who defeated Federer in their first encounter in Miami.

Clay court season
Federer skipped Monte Carlo and decided to begin his clay season at the Rome Masters. He was, however, upset in the second round by 2002 French Open champion Albert Costa.

Federer next played the Hamburg Masters. He defeated former number 1 players Carlos Moyá and Lleyton Hewitt in the quarterfinals and semifinals respectively. He then defeated world number 3 Guillermo Coria in the final to claim his second title in Hamburg and end Coria's longest winning streak of 31 consecutive matches on clay.

He entered the French Open as top seed for the first time ever at a Grand Slam, but was defeated in the third round by former world number 1 and three-time French Open champion Gustavo Kuerten.

Grass court season
Federer entered Halle as the defending champion and quickly solidified his status as the premier grass court player of his generation. He did not drop a set for the entire tournament and convincingly defeated American Mardy Fish in the final by the score of 6–0, 6–3.

After his victory in the grass tuneup at Halle, Federer entered the Wimbledon Championships as the defending champion. Federer was aiming to be the first man to defend his title at Wimbledon since Pete Sampras (1999–2000). The Swiss dropped only one set as he made his way through the tournament and reached the final. He played world number 2 Andy Roddick for the championship in a thrilling four set final. Roddick came out strong with incredible serving and took the first set. The second set began with Federer racing out to a 4–0 lead, but Roddick rallied to level it at 4–4. Federer ultimately broke Roddick in the twelfth game and leveled the match at one set apiece. The pivotal third set was decided by a tiebreaker which was won by the Swiss defending champion. Federer closed out the match in four sets to win his third career Grand Slam.

Summer hard court season

Federer's first tournament after Wimbledon was the Swiss Open at Gstaad. This was a clay court tournament that Federer played because it was a major tournament in his native Switzerland. He had played Gstaad every year between 1998–2003 but had never managed to emerge victorious. That changed in 2004 when Federer defeated Igor Andreev to win a tournament in Switzerland for the first time in his career.

Federer then won the Canada Masters in Toronto where he defeated Andy Roddick in the finals 7–5, 6–3. This was his fourth Masters championship and his first in Canada.

His 23 match winning streak ended surprisingly in the first round of the Cincinnati Masters where Federer was upset by Slovakian Dominik Hrbaty.

Federer entered the Athens Olympics as the top-seeded player and was considered the overwhelming favorite, but he was upset in the second round by Czech teenager and future world number 4 Tomáš Berdych. This would be the last loss Federer would suffer for the remainder of his 2004 season.

Federer entered the 2004 US Open as the top seed looking to win his first US Open championship. Federer cruised through the first four rounds before facing Andre Agassi in the quarterfinals. His match against the two time US Open champion proved to be a thrilling five set epic. After splitting the first two sets the third set went to 5–5 before Federer broke and took a two set to one advantage. Agassi would take the fourth but Federer claimed the fifth and decisive set. In the semifinals Federer eased past former nemesis Tim Henman in straight sets. Federer won his first US Open singles title, defeating Lleyton Hewitt, 6–0, 7–6(3), 6–0, in the final. This was one of the most dominant displays in US Open history as Federer was the first player to win two bagel sets in the final since 1884.

Fall hard court season
Federer began his fall campaign at the Thailand Open. He survived a three set scare against local favorite Paradorn Srichaphan and faced world no. 2 Andy Roddick in the finals. He easily dispatched the American 6–4, 6–0. This was his twelfth consecutive victory in a tournament final which tied the all-time record of Björn Borg and John McEnroe. This victory marked Federer's tenth title of 2004.

Federer skipped the Madrid Masters in order to focus on winning his hometown tournament of the Swiss Indoors in Basel for the first time. However, just before the start of Basel, Federer suffered a muscle fiber rupture in his left thigh and was forced to withdraw. This injury also kept him out of the Paris Masters.

He returned after six weeks out of action at the Tennis Masters Cup in Houston. Federer was honored as the top seed by having lunch with former President George H. W. Bush. He was the defending champion at the Year-End Championships and was placed during the round robin stage in the Red Group. The Red Group consisted of former no. 1 players Carlos Moyá and Lleyton Hewitt as well as reigning French Open champion Gastón Gaudio. He won all three round robin matches, taking six of seven sets, and faced Marat Safin in the semifinals. Federer won the first set, but the second set turned into a historic marathon tiebreaker. The tiebreaker was won by Federer by a score of 20–18 and lasted 27 minutes. The 38 points equalled the longest tie-break in tennis history along with Borg-Lall at 1973 Wimbledon and Ivanisevic-Nestor at 1993 US Open. Federer next faced Lleyton Hewitt in the finals for the sixth time that season and won the championship match 6–3, 6–2. This victory was his thirteenth consecutive victory in a tournament final which broke the record he had shared with Borg and McEnroe.

Season accomplishments
Federer won 11 titles in 2004, which included three Grand Slam titles, three ATP Masters titles, and the Tennis Masters Cup. He was the first player to win three Grand Slam titles in a single year since Mats Wilander in 1988. Federer's win–loss record for the 2004 season was 74–6, which was the best winning percentage of any player since Ivan Lendl was 74–6 in 1986.

In 2016, the ATP named this season as the best in Federer's career. During that year, Federer won 91.6% of his service games, also won 34.8% of his first-serve return points and saved 72.6% of break points against.

Matches

Grand Slam performance

All matches

Singles

Yearly records

Finals

Singles: 11 (11–0)

Prize money earnings

See also
Roger Federer
Roger Federer career statistics

References

External links
  
 ATP tour profile

2004
Federer season
2004 in Swiss tennis
2004 in Swiss sport